Hoy Gising! Kapamilya was a Philippine public affairs program, which is the short lived reboot of the now defunct public service program Hoy Gising!. The show ran from June 26, 2004 to September 17, 2005, replacing Simpleng Hiling and was replaced by Little Big Star. The program served as a comeback of its original host Ted Failon, after spending three years serving as a Representative of the 1st district of Leyte. This was also the last project of Connie Sison to ABS-CBN, prior to her transfer to RPN and later to GMA Network. Each episode was taped on a roving passenger bus.

Hosts
Ted Failon
Connie Sison
Bernadette Sembrano

See also
List of shows previously aired by ABS-CBN
Failon Ngayon

References

ABS-CBN News and Current Affairs shows
ABS-CBN original programming
Philippine television shows
2004 Philippine television series debuts
2005 Philippine television series endings
2000s Philippine television series
Filipino-language television shows